Isolaboides is a genus of earwigs, the sole member of the subfamily Isolaboidinae. It was cited by Srivastava in Part 2 of Fauna of India.

References

External links 
 The Earwig Research Centre's Isolaboides database Source for references: type Isolaboides in the "genus" field and click "search".

Anisolabididae
Dermaptera genera